The men's 100 metre freestyle competition at the 1991 Pan Pacific Swimming Championships took place on August 23 at the Kinsmen Sports Center.  The last champion was Brent Lang of US.

This race consisted of two lengths of the pool, both lengths being in freestyle.

Records
Prior to this competition, the existing world and Pan Pacific records were as follows:

Results
All times are in minutes and seconds.

Heats
The first round was held on August 23.

B Final 
The B final was held on August 23.

A Final 
The A final was held on August 23.

References

1991 Pan Pacific Swimming Championships